Sport União Sintrense is a Portuguese football club based in Sintra, that plays in the Campeonato de Portugal, the third division of Portuguese football. The club was established on 7 October 1911.

Current squad

Notable former players

 Nelson Semedo
 Martin Kuittinen

References

External links

 
Football clubs in Portugal
Football clubs in Lisbon
Association football clubs established in 1911
1911 establishments in Portugal